Tashreeq Morris (born 13 May 1994) is a South African soccer player who plays for Sekhukhune United as a forward.

Club career
Morris joined the Ajax Cape Town youth academy from amateur club Juventus FC. He represented the club in a number of youth tournaments and was part of the winning squads for the Metropolitan Under-19 Premier Cup and the Copa Amsterdam. In July 2013, Morris was promoted to train with the first-team during preparation for the 2013–14 season. He made his league debut as a substitute against Kaizer Chiefs on 5 November 2013 and scored the winning goal in 1–0 victory.

References

External links

1994 births
Living people
South African soccer players
Association football forwards
Cape Coloureds
Soccer players from Cape Town
Cape Town Spurs F.C. players
Cape Town City F.C. (2016) players
Sekhukhune United F.C. players
South African Premier Division players
National First Division players
Footballers at the 2016 Summer Olympics
Olympic soccer players of South Africa